Taiwanese singer-songwriter Kenji Wu has released ten studio albums,  three extended plays, nine singles and two compilation albums. He released his debut album, Tomorrow, Alone,  in 2000.

Studio albums

Extended plays

Compilation albums

Singles

References

Wu, Kenji